Gornja Mlinoga  is a village in central Croatia, in the Town of Petrinja, Sisak-Moslavina County. It is connected by the D30 highway.

Demographics
According to the 2011 census, the village of Gornja Mlinoga has 33 inhabitants. This represents 13.58% of its pre-war population according to the 1991 census.

Notable natives and resident

References

Populated places in Sisak-Moslavina County
Serb communities in Croatia